This list of film awards for lead actor is an index to articles about awards for the lead actor or "Best Actor" in a film. The lists is organized by the region and country of the sponsoring organization or festival, but some awards are not restricted to films or actors from that country. Thus the David di Donatello for Best Foreign Actor, awarded by the Italian Academy of Films, is given to non-Italian actors.

Africa

Americas

Asia

Europe

Oceania

See also

 Best Actor
 Lists of awards
 Lists of acting awards
 List of awards for male actors
 List of film awards

References

 
Actress, lead
film, lead actor